Yendluru is located in the Santhanuthala padu Mandal of Prakasam District in Andhra Pradesh, India.

References

External links 
prakasamdistrict.com

yendluru is neyar by ssn engineering college this is one of the best village.

Mynampadu is a major panchayat in Santhanuthala padu mandal in Prakasam district in the state of Andhra Pradesh in India.

Yendluru is near SSN engineering college this is one of the best village. SSN engineering college was later renamed as District Institute of Education. There are two colleges of in SSN. Hostel and rooms facility are also provided here for students.

This village holds a population of 3,500 most of them are farmers and daily laborers. Usually peaceful village and people of this village are very friendly who are courteous with newcomers to the village.  This lot farmers work in tobacco and rice growing.

Villages in Prakasam district